The Housing and Urban Development Coordinating Council (HUDCC) was the umbrella agency of various housing and development offices of the Philippine government. It was established by President Corazon Aquino through Executive Order No. 90, Series of 1986.

The law creating the Department of Human Settlements and Urban Development (DHSUD), Republic Act No. 11201, was signed into law by President Rodrigo Duterte on February 14, 2019, with the signing announced to the public by the government on February 19, 2019. The DHSUD was a merger of the HUDCC and the Housing and Land Use Regulatory Board (HLURB), with the former becoming defunct and the latter reorganized as the Human Settlements Adjudication Commission (HSAC). The law was a consolidation of House Bill 6775 and Senate Bill 1578 which were passed by the House of Representatives and the Senate on October 10 and November 12, 2018, respectively. The Implement Rules and Regulations (IRR) for RA 11201 was signed on July 19, 2019. A five-month transition period will begin with full implementation of the law on January 1, 2020.

Attached agencies
Home Development Mutual Fund (HDMF)
National Housing Authority (Philippines) (NHA)
Housing and Land Use Regulatory Board (HLURB)
Home Guaranty Corporation (HGC)
National Home Mortgage Finance Corporation (NHMFC)
Social Housing Finance Corporation (SHFC)

Chairperson
Executive Order No. 20, Series of 2001 effectively elevated the chairperson of the HUDCC as a cabinet official, with the officeholder holding the rank of Secretary, subject to the approval of the Commission on Appointments. However, since the administration of President Gloria Macapagal Arroyo, it has been designated as the cabinet portfolio of the Vice President of the Philippines, thus needing no confirmation by the Commission on Appointment as stipulated by the Philippine Constitution.

Vice Presidents Noli de Castro and Jejomar Binay headed the agency during their tenures, although Binay resigned from the post before his term as deputy chief executive lapsed. On July 7, 2016, President Rodrigo Duterte  appointed Vice President Leni Robredo as chairperson of the HUDCC; however, on December 5, Robredo resigned from the post. She was replaced by Cabinet Secretary, Leoncio Evasco Jr. Gen. Eduardo del Rosario (Ret.), the current chairperson, now heads the council.

List of Chairpersons of the Housing and Urban Development Coordinating Council (as Cabinet-level rank)

References

Housing in the Philippines
Urban development
Government agencies established in 1986
2019 disestablishments in the Philippines